Bettina Knells (born 14 April 1971) is a German sport shooter who competed in the 1996 Summer Olympics.

References

1971 births
Living people
German female sport shooters
ISSF rifle shooters
Olympic shooters of Germany
Shooters at the 1996 Summer Olympics